Ganna was an Italian professional cycling team that existed in part between 1913 and 1953. It was started by Luigi Ganna, winner of the general classification of the inaugural Giro d'Italia, and was sponsored by his bicycle and motorcycle manufacturing company. Whilst with the team, Fiorenzo Magni won the general classification of the 1951 Giro d'Italia. The team was the predecessor of the Nivea–Fuchs team.

References

External links

Defunct cycling teams based in Italy
1913 establishments in Italy
1953 disestablishments in Italy
Cycling teams established in 1913
Cycling teams disestablished in 1953